Nikšić Municipality (Montenegrin and Serbian: Opština Nikšić / Општина Никшић) is one of the municipalities of Montenegro. The municipality is located in central and northwestern region of Montenegro. The administrative centre of the municipality is town of Nikšić.

Geography and location
Nikšić municipality has the largest landmass of any municipality in Montenegro (covering 15% of Montenegro), and includes 129 settlements. It was also largest landmass municipality in socialist Yugoslavia. Town of Nikšić is situated in north-central Montenegro. It is located at the centre of the spacious Nikšić field (Nikšićko polje), a karst plain with an area of 48 km2, and an elevation of 640 m AMSL. The plain is surrounded by inhospitable rocky mountainous terrain, a typical landscape of western Montenegro. The city itself is located at the foot of the Trebjesa hill.

Zeta river originates in the Nikšić field, and flows near the city of Nikšić, before it becomes a subterranean river south of the city. The river caused frequent flooding of the plain, until the construction of Hydroelectric power plant Perućica in 1960. The construction of the power plant resulted in creation of three large artificial lakes near the city - Krupac, Slano and Vrtac Lakes.

Local administration

Municipal parliament

Demographics
The 2011 census recorded a total population of 72,443. The inhabitants were largely divided between Montenegrins, numbering 46,149 (63.70%), and Serbs, numbering 18,334 (25.31%), the rest belonging to other ethnic groups (3,114, 4.30%) or opting undeclared (4,846, 6.67%). By language, 43,75% spoke Montenegrin, while 42,44% spoke Serbian. By religious affiliation, Eastern Orthodoxy was predominant (91,38%).

Gallery

References

 
Municipalities of Montenegro